Pseudopsacothea is a genus of longhorn beetles of the subfamily Lamiinae, containing the following species:

 Pseudopsacothea albonotata Pic, 1935
 Pseudopsacothea modiglianii Breuning, 1970

References

Lamiini